Art Centre KulttuuriKauppila is an art centre in Ii, Finland. Local artists Helena Kaikkonen, Sanna Koivisto and Antti Ylönen founded it in 2006. KulttuuriKauppila produces every year art exhibitions, art workshops and lectures.

Home artists 
The founder members of KulttuuriKauppila – textile artist Helena Kaikkonen, visual artist Sanna Koivisto and visual artists, ceramic Antti Ylönen -  work in the art centre, where they have their own studios. Krunni Production Ltd. has also a studio in the ateljé house of the art centre.

Artist residence 
The international Artist-in-Residence programme of KulttuuriKauppila supports and produces international professional art. Every year KulttuuriKauppila chooses about six artists to take part of the AIR-programme. Applications for the residence are processed twice a year.

Summer exhibition 

Every summer KulttuuriKauppila produces a large summer exhibition which is open to the public from June until August. KulttuuriKauppila's first summer exhibition was produced in 2007.

ART Ii Biennale 

Art Centre KulttuuriKauppila organizes ART Ii Biennale of Northern Environmental and Sculpture Art every second year. ART Ii Biennale produces ecologically sustainable artworks to the cultural tradition areas of Ii.

References 
Art Centre KulttuuriKauppila

ART Ii Biennale

Festivals in Finland
Cultural festivals in Finland
Summer festivals